Stuart Alexander Donaldson (born 4 December 1854 in Sydney, Australia, died 29 October 1915) was a schoolmaster, clergyman and Master of Magdalene College, Cambridge.

Life
Donaldson was born in Sydney, the oldest son of Sir Stuart Alexander Donaldson, the first Premier of the Colony of New South Wales.

After education at Eton College Donaldson went to Trinity College, Cambridge as a scholar in 1873, graduating with first class honours in Classics in 1877. From 1878 to 1904 he served as a master at Eton, during this time being ordained as deacon in 1884 and priest in 1885. While a schoolmaster he published, with Edward Lyttelton, Pontes, a book of elementary Latin exercises.

In 1904 he was elected as the Master of Magdalene College, Cambridge, a position he held until his death in 1915, and was awarded the degrees of Bachelor of Divinity in 1905 and Doctor of Divinity in 1910. He served as Vice-Chancellor of the University of Cambridge from 1912 to 1913.

Donaldson married Lady Albinia Frederica Hobart-Hampden, granddaughter of Augustus Edward Hobart-Hampden, the 6th Earl of Buckinghamshire in 1900.

Publications
 Pontes. Elementary Latin Exercises (with E. Lyttelton), 1884
 Science and Faith, 1890
 The Obligation of the Church to Foreign Mission Work generally among Non-Christian Peoples, (Pan-Anglican Papers), 1908
Church Life and Thought in North Africa, A.D. 200, Cambridge University Press, 1909

References

 Obituary in The Times, 30 October 1915

1854 births
1915 deaths
Alumni of Trinity College, Cambridge
Doctors of Divinity
Masters of Magdalene College, Cambridge
Vice-Chancellors of the University of Cambridge